Strings of Consciousness is an eleven-piece band formed by Herve Vincenti and Philippe Petit hailing from cities such as London, Chicago and Paris. Their debut album, Our Moon is Full (2008), was released on Barry Adamson's Central Control label and features guest vocalists such as Barry Adamson, J.G. Thirlwell and Black Sifichi.

Members
Karim Tobbi / Nicholas Dick – guitars
Raphaelle Rinaudo – harp
Andy Diagram – trumpet, electronics
Hervé Vincenti – guitar, samplers
Alison Chesley – cello
Philippe Petit – theremin, laptop, turntables
Perceval Bellone – saxophone, tibetan bowls, flute, piano
Hugh Hopper – electric bass, clarinet
Pierre Fenichel – double bass
Stefano Tedesco – vibraphone
Lenka Zupkova – violin

Guest vocalists
While Strings of Consciousness is an instrumental band, various guest vocalists are used on their debut album Our Moon Is Full:

 J.G. Thirlwell (Foetus) – on Asphodel
 Scott McCloud (Girls Against Boys) – on Crystallize It
 Eugene Robinson (Oxbow) – on Cleanliness Is Next to Godliness
 Barry Adamson – on Sonic Glimpses
 Lisa Smith Klossner – on Defrost Oven
 Black Sifichi – on While the Sun Burns Out Another Sun and Midnight Moonbeams
 Pete Simonelli (Enablers) – on In Between
 Julie Christmas - on The Drone from Beyond Love

Discography

Albums
 Kammerflimmer Kollektief / Strings of Consciousness (2007, Karl Records)
 Our Moon Is Full (2008, Central Control)
 Fantomastique Acoustica (2008, Off Label)
 Strings of Consciousness & Angel (2009, Important Records, Conspiracy Records)
 From Beyond Love (2012, Staubgold)

Remixes
 Tear It Down, (2007, Asthmatic Kitty Records)

Appears on
 Heart of the Sun (2008, Durtro, Jnana Records)

Tracks appear on
 Bip-Hop Generation Vol. 8 (2006, BiP_HOp)
 The Wire Tapper 18 (2007, Wire Magazine)
 Clinical Jazz (2008, Clinical Archives)

References

External links
 Official Website
 Myspace page

Experimental musical groups